Czatkowiella is an extinct genus of long-necked archosauromorph known from Early Triassic (Olenekian age) rocks of Czatkowice 1, Poland. It was first named by Magdalena Borsuk−Białynicka and Susan E. Evans in 2009 and the type species is Czatkowiella harae.

Phylogeny 
Cladogram after Borsuk−Białynicka & Evans (2009).

Cladogram after Spiekman et al. 2021:

References

Prehistoric archosauromorphs
Prehistoric reptile genera
Olenekian genera
Early Triassic reptiles of Europe
Fossils of Poland
Fossil taxa described in 2009